The USP (Universelle Selbstladepistole or "universal self-loading pistol") is a semi-automatic pistol developed in Germany by Heckler & Koch GmbH (H&K) as a replacement for the P7 series of handguns.

History
Design work on a new family of pistols commenced in September 1989, focused primarily on the United States commercial and law enforcement markets. USP prototypes participated in rigorous testing alongside H&K's entry in the Offensive Handgun Weapon System (OHWS) program requested by the U.S. Special Operations Command (USSOCOM), which would later result in the Mk 23 Mod 0. The USP prototypes were then refined in 1992, based on input from the OHWS trials, and the design was finalized in December of the same year. The USP was formally introduced in January 1993 with the USP40 model (the base version) chambered for the increasingly popular .40 S&W cartridge, followed soon by the USP9 (using the 9×19mm Parabellum cartridge), and in May 1995—the USP45 (caliber .45 ACP).
In contrast to the P7, P9S, and VP70Z designs, the USP uses a more conventional Browning-style cam-locked action, similar to that used in the Hi-Power, but with a polymer frame.

Design details
The USP is a semi-automatic pistol with a mechanically locked breech using the short recoil method of operation. This rather conventional lock-up system has a large rectangular lug over the barrel's chamber that rides into and engages the ejection port cut-out in the slide. When a cartridge is fired, pressures generated by the ignited powder drive the cartridge casing back against the breech face on the slide, driving back both the barrel and slide as they remain locked together in the manner described above. After  of unrestricted rearward travel, the projectile leaves the barrel and the gas pressures drop to a safe level. A shaped lug on the underside of the barrel chamber comes into contact with a hooked locking block at the end of the steel recoil spring guide rod, lowering the rear end of the barrel and stopping the barrel's rearward movement. The recoil spring assembly is held in place by the slide stop lever's axis pin and a round cut-out at the front of the slide. For enhanced reliability in high-dust environments, the locking surface on the front top of the barrel's locking lug is tapered with a forward slope. This tapered surface produces a camming action which assists in positive lock-up in the presence of heavy fouling and debris.

One of the distinguishing features of the USP is the mechanical recoil reduction system. It consists of a short additional spring located within the main recoil spring on the breech end of the recoil spring assembly. Designed primarily to reduce wear on the pistol's components, the system also lowers the peak recoil forces felt by the shooter. The design with two springs allows the system to work with different kinds of ammunition without requiring any adjustments. Unlike similar systems employed in other guns, the USP design does not incorporate a hydraulic damper and requires no maintenance. Using a similar recoil reduction system, the H&K Mk 23 pistol fired more than 30,000 high pressure (+P) cartridges and 6,000 proof loads without damage or excessive wear to any major components. Abuse and function-testing of USPs have seen more than 20,000 rounds of .40 S&W fired without a component failure. MILSPEC environmental tests were conducted in high and low temperatures, in mud, immersed in water and in salt spray. In one particular test, a bullet was deliberately lodged in the barrel and another bullet was fired to clear the obstruction. The barrel was successfully cleared with only minor structural deformation and continued to produce consistent groups when test fired for accuracy. The recoil reduction system is not present on the USP Compact models, which instead use a simple polymer bushing as a buffer to reduce slide on frame impact.

Major metal components on both the USP and Special Operations Pistol are corrosion-resistant. Outside metal surfaces such as the steel slide are protected by a proprietary "Hostile Environment" nitride finish. Internal metal parts, such as springs, are coated with a Dow Corning anti-corrosion chemical to reduce friction and wear.

The USP is composed of a total of 54 parts and is broken down into 7 major components for maintenance and cleaning: the barrel, slide, recoil spring, recoil spring guide rod, frame, slide stop and magazine. This is done by retracting the slide back to align the slide stop axis pin with the disassembly notch on the left side of the slide and withdrawing the axis pin.

Variants

The USP was originally built around the .40 S&W cartridge, but a 9×19mm Parabellum was introduced at the same time. In May 1995, Heckler & Koch introduced a .45 ACP variant. The USP Compact series was introduced in 1996 and is available in 9 mm Parabellum, .40 S&W, .45 ACP, and, exclusively to the Compact model, .357 SIG. Other variants of the standard USP include the USP Tactical, USP Expert, USP Match, USP Elite and the standard sidearm of the German Armed Forces (Bundeswehr)—the P8. The USP Tactical .45 ACP variant is also in limited use by the Bundeswehr, designated as the P12.

One of the unique features of the USP is the wide variety of the trigger styles available, which may be quickly swapped. There are nine commercially available modifications (called "variants" by HK).

By using a modular approach to the internal components, the control functions of the USP can be switched from the left to the right side of the pistol for left-handed shooters. The USP can also be converted from one type of trigger/firing mode to another. This includes combination of double-action and single-action (DA/SA) and double-action only (DAO) modes.

In addition to a wide selection of trigger/firing modes, the USP has an ambidextrous magazine release lever that is shielded by the trigger guard from inadvertent actuation. The rear of the USP grip is stepped, and combines with the tapered magazine to allow for rapid reloading. Finger recesses in the grip frame also aid in magazine removal. On 9 mm and .40 caliber USPs, magazines are constructed of polymer reinforced with stainless steel. Magazines on the USP45 are all-metal. All USP magazines will drop free of the pistol frame when the magazine release is depressed. Also, the USP does not have a magazine lockout feature (also known as a magazine disconnector).  Thus, it is possible to fire a chambered round even with the magazine removed. An extended slide release lever is positioned to allow easy operation without changing the grip of the shooting hand.

Variants 1 and 2 (double action/single action, decocking and safety lever)
Variants 1 (lever on left) and 2 (lever on right) allow the user to carry the pistol in a single-action mode (cocked and locked) with the manual safety engaged. This same pistol, without modification, can be carried in double-action mode, with or without the manual safety engaged, and with the benefit of a decocking lever.

Variants 3 and 4 (double action/single action, decocking lever, but no safety)
Variants 3 (lever on left) and 4 (lever on right) provide the user with a frame-mounted decocking lever that does not have the "safe" position. This combination only allows the hammer to be lowered from SA position to DA position. It does not provide the "safe" position to prevent the pistol from firing when the trigger is pulled.

Variants 5 and 6 (double action only, with safety lever)
Variants 5 (lever on left) and 6 (lever on right) operate as double-action-only pistols, with a bobbed hammer always returning to the DA position (forward) after each shot is fired. To fire each shot, the trigger must be pulled through the smooth DA trigger pull. Variants 5 and 6 have a manual safety lever.

Variant 7 (Law Enforcement Modification, no control lever)
Developed for the U.S. government, the Law Enforcement Modification (LEM) is a double-action only model with a unique trigger mechanism.

Variant 8
Never produced.

Variants 9 and 10 (double-action/single-action, safety lever, but no decocker)
Variants 9 (lever on left) and 10 (lever on right) allow the shooter to carry the pistol in a single-action mode (cocked and locked) with the manual safety engaged. This same pistol, without modification, can be carried in double-action mode (hammer down), with or without the manual safety engaged. The double-action mode offers a second-strike/double-action capability in case of a misfire. The control lever has no decocking function on variants 9 and 10, so one would have to lower the hammer manually (or keep the safety on, remove the magazine, and eject any round in the chamber before lowering the hammer).

USP Custom Sport
Almost identical to the standard USP, the Custom sport is aimed at target and practical shooting users. The Custom Sport has a match grade barrel, match trigger and adjustable sights.

USP Compact

The first USP Compact models appeared in 1996. These are scaled-down USPs, and are available in all the same cartridges as the full size version, and additionally the .357 SIG. Due to the smaller size of the frame, magazines for the Compact variant may have a handgrip extension to better accommodate the shooter's hand. Standard flat floorplates are also available for the USP Compact magazines. The USP Compact comes standard with a bobbed hammer equipped with a flat rubber external thumb grip. This reduces possible snag from the hammer on a holster or clothing while the pistol is being drawn, but still allows the USP Compact to be cocked from a decocked position even in the absence of a spurred hammer. This can be done since decocking the weapon does not fully drop the hammer, leaving it in a somewhat "half-cocked" state.

The USP Compact cannot be cocked from a dry-fired position as the hammer will be flush to the back of the slide. However, the operator could pull the trigger approximately halfway back in a dry-fired position to put the hammer in a half-cocked state, allowing the hammer to be fully cocked with the thumb. The P10, designed for German military and police units, is a USP Compact with the addition of a spurred hammer. This hammer can also be installed onto a normal USP Compact. In addition to the variants previously described for the full size USP, an ambidextrous safety is available from the manufacturer as a separate part. After installation, the USP Compact effectively becomes a right or left-handed firearm with respect to the decocker and manual safety functions. Heckler & Koch do not produce caliber conversions, but barrels for .357 SIG and .40 S&W are available from HK and from third-party manufacturers.

USP Tactical

The USP Tactical (9mm Parabellum, .40 S&W, .45 ACP) incorporates fully adjustable suppressor height sights, an extended, threaded barrel with O-ring, and a match grade trigger with adjustable trigger stop. Prior to 2015, there was no USP Tactical model in 9mm. Instead, HK offered the regular "USP9" variant with an extended, threaded barrel and suppressor height sights as the "USP9SD" model. Sound suppressors designed for the USP Tactical are available from Brügger & Thomet and Knight's Armament. A unique characteristic of the USP Tactical is that the barrel is left-hand threaded (counter-clockwise to tighten), which makes the pistol incompatible with suppressors designed for the MK23 Mod 0.

The KSK of the German Army and the German Navy Kampfschwimmer use the USP Tactical under the designation "P12".

USP Compact Tactical

The USP45CT Compact Tactical is a .45 caliber handgun developed for U.S. special operations. It incorporates features of the full-size USP45 Tactical pistol, but is more concealable. Features include an extended, threaded O-ring barrel with polygonal bore profile and suppressor height sights, which may limit the use of holsters designed for standard USP Compact pistols. The USP CT is available in .45 ACP only.

USP Expert

The USP Expert (9 mm Parabellum, .40 S&W, .45 ACP) was introduced in 1998, and includes all the features of the Tactical, but instead of the extended barrel being threaded and protruding from the slide, the Expert uses a longer slide to accommodate the extended barrel. The larger slide adds weight to help reduce muzzle flip and felt recoil. The Expert has adjustable target sights similar to the USP Match, Elite and Tactical, but as on the Elite, the dovetail of the rear sight is lowered into the frame.  The bobbed hammer was a factory option for the Expert if it was to be used in IPSC for the Standard Division because the original version "in its ready condition" did not fit the box for Standard division in IPSC.

USP Match

The USP Match (9 mm Parabellum, .40 S&W, .45 ACP) has the same features offered on the Expert, except for a barrel weight that replaces the elongated slide found on the Expert. This weight is said to provide a recoil counterbalance to aid in target tracking.
It was discontinued in 1999.

USP Elite

The USP Elite (9 mm Parabellum, .45 ACP) combines the characteristics of the Expert with a 6.02 in (153 mm) barrel and a hand-fitted 9.25 in (235 mm) extended slide. The model was designed as a target pistol and has not been adopted by any law-enforcement agency or military organization.

Equipment

The USP has an accessory rail at the front of the frame for attachments of aftermarket equipment such as laser sights and weapon lights. The rail is a proprietary design, and the number of accessories available is extremely limited. Aftermarket adapters providing a standard Picatinny rail are available for both USP and USP Compact models.

Testing
The USP was developed at the same time as the SOCOM MK23; the pistol underwent much of the same testing. The barrel is cold-forged from chromium steel for increased service life. USP barrels after November 1994 use a polygonal profile; 1994 and earlier models use traditional 'land and grooves' rifling. During testing, a bullet was deliberately lodged in a USP barrel. Another cartridge was then fired into the obstructing bullet. The second bullet cleared the barrel, resulting in a barely-noticeable bulge. The pistol was then fired for accuracy, and the resulting group measured less than 4 inches at 25 meters.

Temperature testing required the USP be frozen to −42 °C and fired, frozen again, then be heated to 67 °C and fired. These temperature tests were continually repeated with no adverse effects on the USP.

The gun was also subjected to NATO MILSPEC mud and rain tests; it passed without difficulty. Water immersion and salt spray also presented no problems. German Navy combat divers used the USP for years without any signs of corrosion.

Safety testing exceeded the ANSI/SAAMI requirements adopted in May 1990. These included dropping a USP with a primed cartridge and decocked hammer on a variety of hard surfaces without discharging. The USP surpassed these commercial requirements, as well as German Army and police tests, including repeated drop tests from six feet (1.8 m), hammer first, onto a steel backed concrete slab. Proof round firing resulted in no cracks, deformations, or increase in head space. Attempts to fire the USP pistol with an unlocked breech proved unsuccessful.

Testing with a variety of ammunition proved the USP meets these high standards. During the USP testing phase, the recoil-reduction system reduces the force on the USP grip to approximately 300 newtons (67 pounds-force). Peak force shock on competing .40 caliber polymer and metal framed pistols was around 5,000 newtons (1,100 pounds-force). The primary benefit of low peak shock is a decrease in wear and tear on pistol components, a great concern with the +P cartridge in 9 mm, .40 S&W, and .45 ACP. Reduction of peak shock forces also contributes to softer recoil for the shooter, although these "felt recoil" values are subjective.

Service

The USP was adopted in Germany by the Bundeswehr (German armed forces) as the P8 in 1994. The P8 has minor differences from the standard USP model: translucent magazines, a reversed safety/decocker lever (on the P8, down indicates 'safe', and up indicates 'fire' — the opposite of the standard USP), and the 'S' and 'F' letters are printed onto the frame instead of onto the lever. The P8 has a traditional lands-and-grooves barrel instead of a polygonal barrel.

The P10, adopted by many German State Police forces, is a USP Compact with the addition of a spurred hammer. Both the P8 and P10 are chambered in 9×19mm Parabellum (9mm NATO) only.

In 1998, the H&K USP Compact with the LEM trigger action, in .40 S&W, was adopted by the United States Immigration and Naturalization Service as the duty sidearm for its Special Agents and plainclothes officers. In 2004, after the I&NS's criminal investigations branch merged with the U.S. Customs Service's Office of Investigations into the U.S. Department of Homeland Security's Homeland Security Investigations, the former I&NS Special Agents continued to carry the USP Compact. New duty pistols, the SIG Sauer Model P229 DAK, in .40 S&W, were eventually issued to the HSI Special Agents after new pistol contracts were awarded by the DHS.

On August 24, 2004, SIG Sauer and Heckler & Koch/HK Defense won major pistol contracts with the United States Department of Homeland Security. The contract was valued at $26.2 million. The HK pistol models chosen were the HK P2000 US, HK P2000 SK Subcompact, and the USP Compact/LEM (Law Enforcement Modification). The LEM trigger is HK's version of SIG's DAK trigger, and vice versa. According to the company, the LEM trigger allows for faster follow-up shots (repeat shots) on target than a standard double-action-only system. This is due to a lighter trigger pull (7.3–8.5 lbf) and shorter trigger reset than standard DAO trigger systems. The LEM trigger uses a two-piece "pre-cocked hammer" composed of a cocking piece and an external hammer. The hammer is pre-cocked as a round is chambered (slide is cycled). The LEM system supposedly also provides reliable primer ignition, since it uses a stronger hammer spring.

The LEM trigger can be installed on existing USP Compact pistols acquired before the LEM trigger came on the market—either by a certified gunsmith or by sending the pistol to Heckler & Koch. In addition, the USP Compact pistol can retain its external safety with the LEM trigger—making it the only modified double-action pistol with an external safety.

Users

References

Bibliography

External links

Manufacturer's website
Operator's manual
Modern Firearms
H&K USP .45 pictorial

.357 SIG semi-automatic pistols
.40 S&W semi-automatic pistols
.45 ACP semi-automatic pistols
9mm Parabellum semi-automatic pistols
Police weapons
USP
Post–Cold War weapons of Germany
Weapons and ammunition introduced in 1993